Cook County Board of Commissioners 7th district is a electoral district for the Cook County Board of Commissioners.

The district was established in 1994, when the board transitioned from holding elections in individual districts, as opposed to the previous practice of holding a set of two at-large elections (one for ten seats from the city of Chicago and another for seven seats from suburban Cook County).

Geography

1994 boundaries
When the district was first established, the district represented parts of the southwest side of Chicago, as well as the cities of Cicero and Stickney, Illinois.

2001 redistricting
New boundaries were adopted in August 2001, with redistricting taking place following the 2000 United States Census. The district included part of the southwest side of Chicago, as well as part of the city of Cicero.

In regards to townships and equivalent jurisdictions, the district's redistricted boundaries included portions of the city of Chicago and portions of the Cicero Township.

2012 redistricting
The district currently, as redistricted in 2012 following the 2010 United States Census, is located entirely within the city boundaries of Chicago. It is primarily located on the city's southwest side. Chicago neighborhoods which the district represents include Back of the Yards, Chinatown,  Bridgeport, Brighton Park, Heart of Chicago, Little Village, Lower West Side, McKinley Park, Pilsen, West Lawn.

The district is 18.13 square miles (11,604.98 acres).

Politics
The district has only ever been represented by Democratic commissioners. The district has been strong Democratic in its Cook County Board of Commissioner elections.

Demographics
The district's population is, and has always been, heavily Hispanic.

List of commissioners representing the district

Election results

|-
| colspan=16 style="text-align:center;" |Cook County Board of Commissioners 7th district general elections
|-
!Year
!Winning candidate
!Party
!Vote (pct)
!Opponent
!Party
! Vote (pct)
|-
|1994
| |Joseph Mario Moreno
| | Democratic
| | 
|
|
|
|-
|1998
| |Joseph Mario Moreno
| | Democratic
| | 25,587 (84.27%)
| | Alberto Alva
| | Republican
| | 4,962 (15.73%)
|-
|2002
| |Joseph Mario Moreno
| | Democratic
| |26,491 (83.13%)
| | Juan Moreno
| | Republican
| | 5,377 (16.87%)
|-
|2006
| |Joseph Mario Moreno 
| | Democratic
| |29,779 (100%)
|
|
|
|-
|2010
| |Jesus G. Garcia
| | Democratic
| |24,820 (86.26%)
| | Juan Moreno
| | Green
| | 3,952 (13.74%)
|-
|2014
| |Jesus G. Garcia
| | Democratic
| |25,320 (100%)
|
|
|
|-
|2018
| |Alma E. Anaya
| | Democratic
| |41,759 (100%)
|
|
|
|-
|2022
| |Alma E. Anaya
| | Democratic
| |29,480 (100%)
|
|
|

References

Cook County Board of Commissioners districts
Constituencies established in 1994
1994 establishments in Illinois